Tropidonophis is a genus of snakes in the subfamily Natricinae of the family Colubridae.

Species
The following 20 species are recognized as being valid. 
Tropidonophis aenigmaticus  – East Papuan keelback,
Tropidonophis dahlii  – New Britain keelback
Tropidonophis dendrophiops  – spotted water snake
Tropidonophis dolasii 
Tropidonophis doriae  – barred keelback
Tropidonophis elongatus  – Moluccan keelback
Tropidonophis halmahericus 
Tropidonophis hypomelas  – Bismarck keelback
Tropidonophis mairii  – common keelback, Mair's keelback 
Tropidonophis mcdowelli  – Northern New Guinea keelback
Tropidonophis montanus  – North Irian montane keelback
Tropidonophis multiscutellatus  – many-scaled keelback
Tropidonophis negrosensis  – Negros spotted water snake 
Tropidonophis novaeguineae  – New Guinea keelback
Tropidonophis parkeri  – Parker's keelback, highland keelback
Tropidonophis picturatus  –  painted keelback
Tropidonophis punctiventris  – Halmahera keelback
Tropidonophis spilogaster  – Boie's keelback
Tropidonophis statisticus  – Papua New Guinea montane keelback
Tropidonophis truncatus 

Nota bene: A binomial authority in parentheses indicates that the species was originally described in a genus other than Tropidonophis.

References

Further reading
Jan G (1863). Elenco sistematico degli ofidi descritti e disegnati per l'iconografia generale. Milan: A. Lombardi. vii + 143 pp. (Tropidonophis, new genus, p. 72). (in Italian).
Malnate EV, Underwood G (1988). "Australasian Natricine Snakes of the GenusTropidonophis ". Proceedings of the Academy of Natural Sciences of Philadelphia 140 (1): 59–201.

Tropidonophis
Snake genera
Taxa named by Giorgio Jan